Piper seychellarum (also called Seychelles Pepper) is a species of plant in the family Piperaceae. It is endemic to Seychelles.  Its natural habitat is subtropical or tropical moist lowland forests. It is threatened by habitat loss.

References

seychellarum
Vulnerable plants
Endemic flora of Seychelles
Taxonomy articles created by Polbot